Wenn der Himmel brennt ("When the sky is burning") is the official DVD of Slime. It contains two DVDs with video and audio tracks. The DVD was released in 2003. The records were made between 1978 and 1995.  The songs are recorded partly in English.

Track list

DVD 1
 A.C.A.B
 Bundeswehr (The German army)
 They don't give a fuck
 We're always gonna win
 I wish I was
 Demokratie (Democracy)
 Karlsquell
 Polizei SA SS (Police SA SS)
 Deutschland (Germany)
 Streefight
 Hey Punk
 Yankees out
 Sex & Violence
 TV- song 
 I just wanna know
 D.O.R.F. (V.I.L.L.A.G.E.)
 Nazis raus (Nazis out)
 Junge Junge (Oh Boy)
 Yankees raus (Yankees out)
 Linke Spießer (Left Squares)
 D.I.S.C.O.
 Sand im Getriebe (Sand in the transmission)
 Großer Bruder (Big Brother)
 Wenn der Himmel brennt (When the sky is burning)
 Die Letzten (The last)
 Computerstaat (computer state)

DVD 2
 A.C.A.B.
 legal-Illegal-Scheißeigal (German: "legal-illegal- I don't care") 
 Alle gegen alle ("Everyone against everyone")
 Albtraum ("Nightmare")
 Zu kalt ("Too Cold")
 4. Reich
 Störtebeker
 Deutschland ("Germany")
 Hey Punk
 Iran
 Gerechtigkeit ("Justice")
 Seekarten ("Nautical Charts")
 Religion
 Untergang ("Downfall")
 Wind
 Der Tod ist ein Meister aus Deutschland ("The Death is a Master from Germany")
 Schweineherbst ("Pig Fall")

Audio Tracks
 Hey Punk
 Iran
 Ich hasse (German: "I Hate")
 Keine Führer ("No Leaders")
 A.C.A.B.
 Karlsquell
 D.I.S.C.O.
 Deutschland (Germany)
 Zehn kleine Nazischweine ("Ten Little Nazi Pigs")
 Schicksalsspiel ("Game of Destiny")
 Der Tod ist ein Meister aus Deutschland ("The Death is a Master from Germany")
 Schweineherbst ("Pig Fall")
 Krieg in den Städten (War in the Cities")
 We must bleed

Slime (band) albums
2003 video albums